Seventy-seven rivers and creeks of at least 50 miles (80 km) in total length are the longest streams of the U.S. state of Oregon. All of these streams originate in the United States except the longest, the Columbia, which begins in the Canadian province of British Columbia and flows 1,249 miles (2,010 km) to the sea near Astoria. Some of the other streams also cross borders between Oregon and California, Nevada, Idaho, or Washington, but the majority flow entirely within Oregon.

The Atlas of Oregon ranks 31 rivers in the state by average streamflow; the top five are the Columbia, Snake, Willamette, Santiam, and Umpqua.  Not all Oregon rivers with high average flows are on this list of longest streams because neither their main stems nor any of their tributaries (including what are called "forks") are at least 50 miles (80 km) long. High-flow streams mentioned in the Atlas but not included in this long-stream list are the Metolius, Hood, Youngs, and Coos rivers. On the other hand, the list includes four low-flow intermittent streams—Dry River, Rattlesnake Creek, Rock Creek, and Dry Creek—that cross parts of the Oregon High Desert.

The direction of Oregon stream flow is influenced by four major drainage divides: the Oregon Coast Range on the west, the Cascade Range further inland, the Klamath–Siskiyou Mountains in the southwest, and the Blue Mountains in the northeast. One set of streams, including the Nehalem River, flows directly into the Pacific Ocean or into larger streams flowing directly to the Pacific; other streams, such as the Deschutes River, flow into the Columbia River or its tributaries. A third set, including the Klamath River and its tributaries, originates in Oregon, but its waters eventually flow into northern California before reaching the ocean. Other streams like the Donner und Blitzen River flow into closed basins, such as Malheur Lake, that have no outlet to the sea.

Source data for the table below came from topographic maps created by the United States Geological Survey and published on-line by TopoQuest, and from the Atlas of Oregon; the Oregon Atlas and Gazetteer; two federally produced geographic information system (GIS) datasets—the National Hydrography Dataset and the National Watershed Boundary Dataset—and other sources as noted. In the table, total lengths are given in miles (mi) and kilometers (km), and elevations are in feet (ft) and meters (m).

Rivers and creeks

Map

See also
 List of rivers of Oregon
 List of longest rivers in the United States by state

Notes and references
Notes

References

Works cited

External links
 Map of Oregon drainage basins published by State of Oregon Water Resources Department

Longest
Streams,longest
Oregon